Lancelot Townshend Driffield (10 August 1880 – 9 October 1917) was an English cricketer who played in first-class cricket matches for Cambridge University and Northamptonshire between 1900 and 1908. He was born in Old, Northamptonshire and died in Leatherhead, Surrey. He appeared in 61 first-class matches as a left-handed batsman who bowled left-arm orthodox spin. He scored 851 runs with a highest score of 56 and took 137 wickets with a best performance of seven for 7.

Driffield was educated at St John's School, Leatherhead, and St Catharine's College, Cambridge. He returned to St John's School as a teacher in 1911 and taught there until his death.

Notes

1880 births
1917 deaths
People educated at St John's School, Leatherhead
Alumni of St Catharine's College, Cambridge
Schoolteachers from Surrey
English cricketers
Cambridge University cricketers
Northamptonshire cricketers